Ivan Daniš (born 29 January 1951) is a Czech hurdler. He competed in the men's 400 metres hurdles at the 1972 Summer Olympics.

References

1951 births
Living people
Athletes (track and field) at the 1972 Summer Olympics
Czech male hurdlers
Olympic athletes of Czechoslovakia
Place of birth missing (living people)